Victor Bobsin Pereira (born 12 January 2000) is a Brazilian professional footballer who plays as either a defensive midfielder or a central midfielder for Portuguese club Santa Clara.

Club career

Grêmio
Born in Osório, Brazil, Victor Bobsin joined the Grêmio's Academy at the age of 12 in 2012.

Santa Clara
On 4 August 2022, Bobsin signed a three-year contract with Santa Clara in Portugal.

Career statistics

Club

International

Honours
Brazil U17
Campeonato Sudamericano Sub-17: 2017

Grêmio
Campeonato Gaúcho: 2021, 2022
Recopa Gaúcha: 2021

References

External links

Profile at the Grêmio F.B.P.A. website

2000 births
Sportspeople from Rio Grande do Sul
Living people
Brazilian footballers
Brazil youth international footballers
Brazil under-20 international footballers
Association football midfielders
Grêmio Foot-Ball Porto Alegrense players
C.D. Santa Clara players
Campeonato Brasileiro Série A players
Primeira Liga players
Brazilian expatriate footballers
Expatriate footballers in Portugal
Brazilian expatriate sportspeople in Portugal